This is a list of stations on the Nizhny Novgorod Metro system in Russia.

References

stations
 
Nizhny Novgorod